Ondřej Petrák (born 11 March 1992) is a Czech professional footballer who is currently signed to Bohemians Praha in the Fortuna Liga. He represented the Czech Republic at under-21 level and spent several seasons playing in Germany.

Career

Slovan Bratislava
On 24 July 2020, Slovan Bratislava have announced signing of a three-year deal with Petrák. He was set to replace departing Marin Ljubičić and fill-in for Filip Lichý, who suffered a serious injury in previous months. He was recommended by former Slovak international Marek Mintál, managing in Nürnberg's structures.

References

External links
 
 
 

1992 births
Living people
Footballers from Prague
Association football midfielders
Czech footballers
Czech Republic youth international footballers
Czech Republic under-21 international footballers
Czech expatriate footballers
SK Slavia Prague players
1. FC Nürnberg players
Dynamo Dresden players
ŠK Slovan Bratislava players
Bohemians 1905 players
Czech First League players
Bundesliga players
2. Bundesliga players
Slovak Super Liga players
2. Liga (Slovakia) players
Expatriate footballers in Germany
Czech expatriate sportspeople in Germany
Expatriate footballers in Slovakia
Czech expatriate sportspeople in Slovakia